José Balitón Nísperos (December 30, 1887 – September 1, 1922) was a member of the Philippine Scouts who received the Medal of Honor during the Moro Rebellion. He was the first Asian to be awarded the medal. On September 24, 1911, at Lapurap, Basilan, Philippines, Nísperos, a member of the U.S. Army's 34th Company of the Philippine Scouts, defended his unit's position against natives armed with spears despite being severely wounded. Nísperos became the first Filipino and Asian to receive the Medal of Honor; the medal was presented by Brigadier General Bell in February 1913.

Nisperos joined the Philippine Scouts in December 1907. Due to wounds suffered in his MOH action, he was discharged at the rank of corporal for disability in June 1912.

Medal of Honor citation

Having been badly wounded (his left arm was broken and lacerated and he had received several spear wounds in the body so that he could not stand) continued to fire his rifle with one hand until the enemy was repulsed, thereby aiding materially in preventing the annihilation of his party and the mutilation of their bodies.

See also

List of Medal of Honor recipients
List of Asian American Medal of Honor recipients
List of Philippine–American War Medal of Honor recipients

References

External links

United States Army Medal of Honor recipients
Military personnel of the Philippine–American War
1887 births
1922 deaths
People from San Fernando, La Union
Foreign-born Medal of Honor recipients
American military personnel of Filipino descent
Philippine–American War recipients of the Medal of Honor